Joseph Whitaker School is a secondary school with academy status in Rainworth near Mansfield, Nottinghamshire in England. The school takes its name from Joseph Whitaker, a naturalist who lived in Rainworth at Rainworth Lodge.

The school is part of the East Midlands Educational Trust (EMET) which it joined in September 2016. The headteacher is Carey Ayres, who took over from David Bell in 2020.

The school has its own sixth form college for post-16 A-Level studies. In November 2012, the school's flagship £1,000,000 sixth form centre opened. It contains teaching rooms, a media suite, various study areas and a café. All post-16 students have access to the school's on-site fitness suite as part of their membership to the sixth form.

References

Secondary schools in Nottinghamshire
Educational institutions established in 1963
1963 establishments in England
Academies in Nottinghamshire
Rainworth